Vasil Kanchov (Spelled in Old Bulgarian Orthography: Василъ Кѫнчовъ)   (26 July 1862 – 6 February 1902) was a Bulgarian geographer, ethnographer and politician.

Biography 

Vasil Kanchov was born in Vratsa. Upon graduating from High school in Lom, Bulgaria, and later he entered the University of Harkov, then in the Russian empire. During the Serbo-Bulgarian War 1885 he suspended his education and took part in the war. Later, he went on to pursue studies at universities in Munich and Stuttgart, but in 1888 he interrupted his education again due to an illness.

In the following years Kanchov was a Bulgarian teacher in Macedonia. He was a teacher in the Bulgarian Men's High School of Thessaloniki (1888–1891), a director of Bulgarian schools in Serres district (1891–1892), a headmaster of Bulgarian Men's High School of Thessaloniki (1892–1893), а chief school inspector of the Bulgarian schools in Macedonia (1894–1897).

After 1898 Kanchov returned to Bulgaria and went into politics. In the beginning of 1902 he became an educational minister of Bulgaria, but was killed in his office by a psychopath.

He travelled extensively after 1888, visiting and researching all over Macedonia.

About him one of the founders of IMRO - Ivan Hadzhinikolov, said that Kanchov once had claimed that he came as a teacher in Thessaloniki to Bulgarianize Macedonia. Hadzhinikolov replied that he was overestimating himself, as Macedonia had long been Bulgarian and that Macedonian Bulgarians had been working for this for a long time.

Works
 
Orohydrography of Macedonia 1911 ("Орохидрография на Македония").
The region of Bitola, Prespa and Ohrid. Travel notes.. 1890 ("Битолско, Преспа и Охридско. Пътни бележки").
The present and the past of the town of Veles. 1892 ("Сегашното и недавнашното минало на гр. Велес").

Honours
Kanchov Peak on Loubet Coast, Antarctica is named after Vasil Kanchov.

References

1862 births
1902 deaths
1902 murders in Europe
Bulgarian educators
Assassinated Bulgarian politicians
People murdered in Bulgaria
Members of the Bulgarian Academy of Sciences
Members of the National Assembly (Bulgaria)
19th-century Bulgarian people
People of the Serbo-Bulgarian War
People from Vratsa
Bulgarian geographers
Bulgarian ethnographers
Bulgarian murder victims
20th-century Bulgarian politicians
Deaths by firearm in Bulgaria